Iver Arena, previously known as Swedbank Park or Solid Park Arena, is a multi-use stadium in Västerås, Sweden.  It is currently used mostly for football matches and is the home ground of Västerås SK Fotboll.  The stadium holds 7,044 people and was opened in 2008.  It replaced Arosvallen as the home of Västerås SK.

In January 2016 there was a name change from Swedbank Park to Solid Park Arena after IT company Solid Park bought the naming rights.

In early 2020 the IT company Iver bought Solid Park and the naming rights for the arena were included in the deal.

References

External links
 Rocklunda Sport & Event AB
 Swedbank Park
 Official Iver Arena Song

Football venues in Sweden
Västerås SK Fotboll
Sport in Västerås
Sports venues completed in 2008
2008 establishments in Sweden